Woman's Club or Women's Club may refer to:

List of women's clubs

Woman's club movement in the United States
Woman's club movement in the United States
List of women's clubs#United States
General Federation of Women's Clubs

Film
 Women's Club (1936 film), or Club de femmes, a French film 
 Women's Club (1956 film), or Club de femmes, a French-Italian drama film

See also
Woman's Club House (disambiguation)
Women-only space